Bezirk Gmünd is a district of the state of 
Lower Austria in Austria.  It is located in northwestern Waldviertel.

Municipalities
Towns (Städte) are indicated in boldface; market towns (Marktgemeinden) in italics; suburbs, hamlets and other subdivisions of a municipality are indicated in small characters.
Amaliendorf-Aalfang
Aalfang, Amaliendorf, Falkendorf
Bad Großpertholz
Abschlag, Angelbach, Bad Großpertholz, Hirschenstein, Karlstift, Mühlbach, Reichenau am Freiwald, Scheiben, Seifritz, Steinbach, Watzmanns, Weikertschlag
Brand-Nagelberg
Alt-Nagelberg, Brand, Finsternau, Neu-Nagelberg, Steinbach
Eggern
Eggern, Reinberg-Heidenreichstein, Reinberg-Litschau
Eisgarn
Eisgarn, Groß-Radischen, Klein-Radischen, Wielings
Gmünd
Breitensee, Eibenstein, Gmünd, Grillenstein
Großdietmanns
Dietmanns, Ehrendorf, Eichberg, Höhenberg, Hörmanns bei Weitra, Reinpolz, Unterlembach, Wielands
Großschönau
Engelstein, Friedreichs, Großotten, Großschönau, Harmannstein, Hirschenhof, Mistelbach, Rothfarn, Schroffen, Thaures, Wachtberg, Wörnharts, Zweres
Haugschlag
Griesbach, Haugschlag, Rottal, Türnau
Heidenreichstein
Altmanns, Dietweis, Eberweis, Guttenbrunn, Haslau, Heidenreichstein, Kleinpertholz, Motten, Seyfrieds, Thaures, Wielandsberg, Wolfsegg
Hirschbach
Hirschbach, Stölzles
Hoheneich
Hoheneich, Nondorf
Kirchberg am Walde
Fromberg, Hollenstein, Kirchberg am Walde, Süßenbach, Ullrichs, Weißenalbern
Litschau
Gopprechts, Hörmanns bei Litschau, Josefsthal, Litschau, Loimanns, Reichenbach, Reitzenschlag, Saaß, Schandachen, Schlag, Schönau bei Litschau
Moorbad Harbach
Harbach, Hirschenwies, Lauterbach, Maißen, Schwarzau, Wultschau
Reingers
Grametten, Hirschenschlag, Illmanns, Leopoldsdorf, Reingers
Schrems
Anderlfabrik, Ehrenhöbarten, Gebharts, Kiensaß, Kleedorf, Kottinghörmanns, Kurzschwarza, Langegg, Langschwarza, Neulangegg, Neuniederschrems, Niederschrems, Pürbach, Schrems
Sankt Martin
Anger, Breitenberg, Harmanschlag, Joachimstal, Langfeld, Maißen, Oberlainsitz, Reitgraben, Rörndlwies, Roßbruck, Schöllbüchl, Schützenberg, St. Martin, Zeil
Unserfrau-Altweitra
Altweitra, Heinrichs bei Weitra, Ober-Lembach, Pyhrabruck, Schagges, Ulrichs, Unserfrau
Waldenstein
Albrechts, Groß-Höbarten, Groß-Neusiedl, Grünbach, Klein-Ruprechts, Waldenstein, Zehenthöf
Weitra
Großwolfgers, Oberbrühl, Oberwindhag, Reinprechts, Spital, St. Wolfgang, Sulz, Tiefenbach, Unterbrühl, Walterschlag, Weitra, Wetzles

 
Districts of Lower Austria